Josh Thor Johnson (born 16 April 1981 in Carenage) is a footballer from Trinidad and Tobago, who plays as a midfielder. He has appeared for the Trinidad and Tobago national team.

Career

Professional 
Johnson began his career with San Juan Jabloteh in Trinidad and Tobago. He played there from 2000 until July 2006. Johnson had trials with Wrexham in July 2006, making a great impression. Denis Smith was very interested in Josh. Even though money was an issue at the time for Wrexham it did not stop him signing Johnson to the club on 8 August 2006. He made almost 30 appearances in the Football League for Wrexham, scoring one goal. He was released by Wrexham in May 2008 following the club's relegation to the Football Conference. Johnson joined Welsh Premier League club Rhyl in August 2008.

International 
Johnson has represented Trinidad and Tobago internationally at various levels. He played for the U-20 national team at the 2001 CONCACAF U-20 Tournament in Trinidad and Tobago. He also played for the U-23 national team at the 2004 CONCACAF Men's Pre-Olympic Tournament in Mexico. He got his first call up to the senior team leading up to a matchup with Cuba during the third round of CONCACAF qualification for the 2010 FIFA World Cup. However, he has not made the match day roster for a senior team match.

References

External links
 
 Player Profile - Josh Johnson at Soca Warriors Online
 Welsh Premier profile

1981 births
Living people
Trinidad and Tobago footballers
Trinidad and Tobago expatriates in the United Kingdom
TT Pro League players
San Juan Jabloteh F.C. players
English Football League players
Wrexham A.F.C. players
AFC Telford United players
Cymru Premier players
Rhyl F.C. players
Association football midfielders
Airbus UK Broughton F.C. players